James Torre (1649–1699) was an English antiquarian and genealogist.

Birth and Background
James was born around 30 April 1649, when he was baptised in Haxey church (Lincolnshire).  His family had been small landowners in the Isle of Axholme since the 15th century.  He was the son of Gregory Torre, remembered as a defiant royalist by his descendants, and of his wife Anne, daughter and heir of John Farr of Epworth. Around 1650 Gregory's fortunes were partly retrieved when he inherited the substantial estate of his elder brother Thomas Torre, which included the small manor of Temple Belwood in Belton where James was to grow up. He was educated at a school in Belton and matriculated into Magdalene College, Cambridge as a pensioner in June 1666, where he spent two and a half years, graduating B.A. in 1668.  Torre entered the Inner Temple as a student, but was not called to the bar, though a list of his small library he made in 1686 shows that he at least bought the necessary textbooks.

The Life of James Torre
Torre's life and career has been understood till recently through a memorial composed by the York historian Francis Drake nearly four decades after his death.  Drake knew James's son Nicholas, but never met the man himself, and he interpreted Torre's career through his later work on the ecclesiastical province of York, not acknowledging his longstanding earlier enthusiasm for genealogy and heraldry.

James Torre as Antiquarian
Crouch finds some evidence in his surviving notebooks that Torre was already making genealogical and heraldic notes in his London days as an Inner Temple student and Jan Broadway points to the influence in this area of his legal guardian, the Revd Robert Mirfin, as well as the gentry culture of other Inner Temple students in his days there.  The estate and day books that James began keeping in 1671 show that he had been researching his own medieval ancestry and settled on a sign manual of James 'Turre' not 'Torre' as it reflected the medieval spelling of his family's surname.

Torre and Lincolnshire, 1672-87
James Torre had succeeded as an eleven-year-old to his father's not insubstantial estate in North Lincolnshire in 1660, and was brought up in the Elizabethan manor house that his predecessor Sir John Ferne had built at Temple Belwood on the outskirts of Belton. In 1672, now of age, James returned to Belton and spent £255 renovating the Ferne manor house, getting it ready to receive his bride, Elizabeth, youngest daughter of Dr William Lincolne, rector of West Halton and lord of the manor of Bottesford.  They married at Bottesford that April, and he and his wife, whom he called 'Betty', settled into gentry life in Axholme.  He was churchwarden of Belton parish between 1676 and 1678 and overseer of the poor in 1679.  Crouch uses Torre's surviving day book to illustrate his busy activities in his twenties and thirties as a Lincolnshire landowner with an interest in cattle breeding, and visiting amongst a wide social circle in the parish gentry.  These years however were not uniformly happy.  He and Betty lost several children in infancy; one child only, Jane (born 1682), survived to adulthood from their marriage.  A son John died aged five in October 1682 and was buried in Belton church.  The death of his father-in-law Dr Lincolne in 1681 led to a dispute amongst the heirs, two of them alleging irregularities in disposing of the doctor's property in his last years to Betty and her husband.  It was settled by arbitration but appears to have left a bad taste in Torre's mouth.

Torre's Move to Yorkshire
There are indications that Torre was looking to Yorkshire for social as well as scholarly reasons before the 1680s.  Betty Torre's closest family link was with her next eldest sister Dorothea, who had married as his second wife John Wyvell of Osgodby Hall in Cayton parish south of the resort of Scarborough. The Torres visited Osgodby Hall regularly, and while there James interested himself in his brother-in-law's medieval charters and visited local churches to look at genealogical monuments. There is also good evidence that in the late 1670s he was already seeking the acquaintance of the lively circle of Yorkshire antiquarians around Dr Nathaniel Johnston of Pontefract as a way of furthering his genealogical work, which by 1685 had generated a substantial stack of notebooks.  He was scouting out a move to York in the autumn of 1686 and at Michaelmas (29 September) 1687 he and his little family quit Temple Belwood, which he had leased to another local landowner, Robert Popplewell, to whom he was eventually to sell both it and much of the rest of his Lincolnshire estate in 1699 to finance a move from the city of York to the West Riding.  The remainder of Torre's scholarship was carried out in Yorkshire.  It was not long before he became a respected habitué of the Minster Library and Chapter Registry.  Very soon the focus of his work shifted away from his great genealogical scheme to correct and expand Sir William Dugdale's Baronage of England (1675-76) which he had been pursuing for a decade and more, to a new focus on the clergy and ecclesiastical history of the diocese of York, for which he is now chiefly famous.  On the death of Betty Torre in 1693 he married Ann, daughter of Nicholas Lister of Rigton, by whom he was to have his son and heir Nicholas Torre (1694-1749).  James Torre died on 31 July 1699 of (according to his friend Ralph Thoresby) a "contagious disorder" shortly after his purchase of a country estate at Snydall, near Pontefract; he was buried in the parish church at Normanton, where there was a brass set up to his memory, which along with other published memorials testified to his civil and engaging personality as well as his learning, mourning him as 'missed by all'.

Works
Torre published nothing from his great collection of notebooks, but it is nonetheless a tribute to his remarkable work ethic and sense of organisation that the manuscript volumes of his Yorkshire collections have been so influential on subsequent scholarship on the church of York.  Five folio volumes of Yorkshire notes were presented to the chapter library by Archbishop John Sharp's executors. The first volume has the title Antiquities Ecclesiastical of the City of York concerning Churches, Parochial Conventual Chapels, Hospitals, and Gilds, and in them Chantries and Interments, also Churches Parochial and Conventual within the Archdeaconry of the West Riding, collected out of Publick Records and Registers, A.D. 1691. The other archdeaconries are treated in similar fashion in two more volumes; the fourth volume consists of peculiars.  Equally important was the list and digest he made of the collection of medieval charters and fragments which had once been stored in St Mary's Tower in York, survived its destruction in 1644 but which have since been lost (Bodleian Library, Oxford University MS Top Yorks b 14, fos 214v-261v) and transcripts from the lost cartulary of the Yorkshire gentry family of Metham of Metham.  Less well known and less ultimately useful to scholars are the many folio volumes he compiled after 1675 in pursuit of his genealogical master plan.  Five volumes were recorded by Drake as in the hands of Nicholas Torre in 1736.  Eventually they came into the hands of his cousins, the Sykes family of Sledmere and were sold by Sir Christopher Sykes MP (1831-98) to the British Library in 1881.  They are now MSS Egerton 2573-2577.  A further eight volumes of genealogical notes remained in the hands of the Torre family, to be left to York Minster Library by James's descendant, the Revd Henry J. Torre of Norton Curlieu (1819-1904) in his will.  They are now MSS Additional 57-64 in the Minster Library.  Mention should be made of James Torre's two personal notebooks which have somehow survived.  One is an estate book, recording details of the rentals, charters and indentures of his Lincolnshire lands (British Library, MS Additional 34146). His day book, listing his daily expenses and receipts from 1672 to 1690. as well as the building accounts of 1672 for his renovations of his manor house of Temple Belwood, is to be found in the Leeds Library, MS Box IV 5.

Sources
 Broadway, Jan, 'James Torre (1649–1699)’, ODNB.
 The Diary of Ralph Thoresby, ed. J. Hunter (2 vols, London, 1830)
 Stonehouse, W.B. The History and Topography of the Isle of Axholme (London, 1839).
 The Metham Family Cartulary: Reconstructed from Antiquarian Transcripts, ed. David Crouch (Yorkshire Archaeological and Historical Society, Record Series, 167, 2022).

Notes

 

1649 births
1699 deaths
English antiquarians
English genealogists
People from the Borough of North Lincolnshire